Allan Guy Shepard (December 18, 1922 – May 27, 1989)  was an American attorney, politician, and jurist who served on the Idaho Supreme Court for two decades, including time as chief justice. He was previously the state's attorney general for six years, preceded by four years as a state legislator.

Early life and education
Born in Massachusetts, Shepard studied engineering at Boston University, then left to serve in the United States Army Air Forces during World War II as a B-24 waist gunner. He completed his bachelor's and law degrees at the University of Washington in Seattle.

Career 
Shepard was a two-term state legislator from Ada County when elected state attorney general in 1962 and re-elected in 1966. As attorney general, he was an active member of the National Association of Attorneys General.

Elected to the Idaho Supreme Court in August 1968, Shepard served as a justice for over two decades, with three stints as chief justice, including the final two years.

He was the first in Idaho to be elected to all three branches of the state government.

Personal life
After a heart attack in late-1987, Shepard had another in May 1989 and died of complications at age 66 at St. Alphonsus Regional Medical Center in Boise.

References

External links

1919 births
1989 deaths
Idaho lawyers
Idaho Republicans
Idaho Attorneys General
Justices of the Idaho Supreme Court
United States Army Air Forces personnel of World War II
University of Washington School of Law alumni